Akshayakalpa is the first certified organic milk brand in India . Headquartered in Tiptur, Karnataka, the company manufactures and sells organic milk products. The organization was founded in 2010.

History 
Akshayakalpa originated from the Youva Chethna Program.

Nine techies, including Akshayakalpa co-founder and managing director Shashi Kumar and his friends Venkatesh Seshasayee, Ranjith Mukundan, Ravishankar Shiroor, Ramakrishna Adukuri, Praveen Nale, Giridhar Bhat, Ramkumar Iyer and Mohammed Ashraf, then working with Wipro Technologies, were some of the earliest contributors to the Youva Chethana Program.

Akshayakalpa was registered as a company on October 2, 2010. The above-mentioned contributors seed funded into Akshayakalpa in November the same year. The initiative was also crowdfunded by several other employees of Wipro Technologies. 

Akshayakalpa had 130 farms in the Tiptur area by 2016.

By 2020, the organization had partnered with 580 farmers in the Tiptur district, whose average income was ₹ 89000 per month. 

Today, the company works with farmers in and around Tiptur, Karnataka and Chengalpattu, Tamil Nadu, and helping them to become entrepreneurs by transforming their farming operations from livelihood focused to wealth creation opportunities. The organization plans to build its network by working with more than 100 such farmers and satellite farms owned by farmers in Chengulpattu.

The company works with farmers in and around Tiptur, Arsikere, Channarayapatna, Chikkanayakana Halli, Kadur and Holenarasipura. The company is also planning to expand its operations in Chennai with an investment of over ₹ 15 crores in the next few years.

Philosophy 
Akshayakalpa was founded as a farmer entrepreneurship initiative. The organization aims to address the bilateral problem of economic non-viability in agriculture which entails farmers to either move away from farming or resort to means like chemical fertilizers and pesticides and poor-quality food for the consumer. The team identifies young farmers who have discontinued farming operations due to economic non-viability and provides them with bank links, farmers outreach, technical services and access to markets in order to encourage them to return to farming.

Farms 
Akshayakalpa does not own any dairy farms, but its staff organizes and guides the local farmers who own these farms. Akshayakalpa does own a 40,000 liter/day capacity Organic Milk Processing Plant where milk collected from collaborating farmers is packed and processed. The plant is set up on 24 acres of land, 13 km away from Tiptur. The milk processed in this plant is supplied to Bangalore and Tumkur daily and is 100% organic.

Akshayakalpa works with farmers to set up small organic dairy farms that are owned and looked after by the farmer. Each farm invests ₹ 25 lakhs, financed by Akshayakalpa partner banks, which is utilized to build the farms. The farms are made up of twenty-five cows, automatic milking systems, a biogas plant, a bio-digester, fodder choppers and a chilling unit. The organization assures the buyback of milk, and farmers are paid around ₹ 28-32 a litre depending on the fat content of milk.

Inducting farmers to the Akshayakalpa model takes between 18 and 24 months. The farmers are educated on maintaining soil without chemicals, closed-loop soil management, and raising cows without the use of antibiotics or growth hormones. Akshayakalpa provides guidance on the design in addition to directing farmers from where to source equipment and helps on services like vaccinations and maintenance without charge, but farmers have to pay for consumables. The organization's staff of 40 members train farmers regularly and initial engagement charges are quite high.

The cows are mainly fed on green fodder grown without chemical inputs. The animals receive regular check-ups from doctors trained in ethnoveterinary practices to ensure they are healthy and produce milk free from antibiotics and growth hormones. The animals of local breeds are cross-bred with high-yielding alien animals for better adaptability.

All the farms associated with Akshayakalpa have the same design. Housing for the animals is steel-roofed sheds with rubber mats on cemented floors. The cows and calves are stall-fed but not tethered. They are free to graze on a dedicated paddock area, and the dung is cleared. 

The dung and urine are flushed into a biogas plant. The gas (methane) is used to operate a generator that produces power for eight hours a day. This electricity is used to power the day-to-day activities on farms. Further, the slurry from the bio-gas plant is redirected to a bio-digester. The filtrate is pumped out through a sprinkler system to the farm. The cultivation is organic, avoiding chemical fertilizers.

The milking is done with machines and the milk is chilled on site to 4 degrees Celsius. The system sends the data to the central server where it is analyzed.

References 

Dairy products companies of India